Yarona FM is an urban broadcaster targeting young adults. The radio station is a private commercial entity that has existed since 1999. It is regulated by BOCRA and attracts a unique weekly audience of 250, 000.

Yarona FM identifies itself with relevant, engaging and compelling talk and news content targeting the youth. We pride ourselves in articulating our audience’s key issues o

of interest from a socio-economic, lifestyle, political and entertainment point of view well. Furthermore, we are well known for our unique on-air promotions.

History 
The radio station started its 24-hour broadcast on August 22, 1999, and at first was primarily a local broadcaster within Gaborone (the capital city of Botswana) covering a radius of 50 km from its central transmitter. In June 2007 the station was offered a national broadcast license by Botswana Communications Regulatory Authority and began a national rollout covering Botswana's major centres: Lobatse, Mahalapye, Serowe, Palapye, Selibe Phikwe, Francistown and Maun.

For much of its history, its programming focus was on arts and culture, primarily consisting of programs devoted to RnB, Hip Hop, Motswako and Pop music.

Brand
From its conception, Yarona FM has identified itself with the "freshest" and newest songs, targeted towards Botswana's urban youth audience. Its initial tag lines were "Re tswhere vibe": setswana for "we've got the vibe" and "blazing GC's most rocking tunes". When the station went national in 2008, the tag line changed to "Live the music". Yarona FM is a positive, upwardly mobile forward thinking brand that encapsulates the aspirations, style, language, lives and future of the Youth of Botswana.

Frequencies(From South to North)
Until April 2008, the radio station was broadcasting through the frequency 106.6 FM, which was part of its logo and brand until 7 more frequencies were added.

Lobatse: 102.1 FM
Gaborone: 106.6 FM
Mahalapye: 99.9 FM
Serowe: 102.9 FM
Palapye: 105.1 FM
Selibe Phikwe & Maun: 97.5 FM
Francistown: 100.1 FM
Sojwe: 100.8 FM
Salajwe : 98.2 FM
Takatokwane, Jwaneng & Senyamadi: 104.9 FM
Malwelwe : 94.9 FM

Popular past presenters
Japs, Luzboy, Stups dawg, Big Duke Bonni (Current Programmes Manager), Tumie Ramsden, DJ Izzy, Chawa Bale, Dollar Mac, King Bee, Tshepo Ntshole, Dig Nash, Otis Fraser, Kepi, O'neal, Junior Psy, Jazelle, Owen Rampha (Current general manager), McD, Kedi Lezozo, Scar, Kingdom, Dum-luv, MduThaParty, and Big Fish are all popular names identified with the Yarona FM brand in the past. Some of these have now moved on to other local radio stations or to other ventures. Of late, and due to the high standards at Yarona FM, the station has become the number one breeding ground for talent amongst other broadcast entities in Botswana.

The youngest presenter in the history of the station are Kabelo "Japs" Tlhomelang (at age 15), airing in July 2000 with Kgosi "Dollar Mac" Kgosidintsi.

Yarona FM schedule

Podcasting 
Yarona FM shows are also available via podcast on the stations SoundCloud account.

Schedule 
The network's base schedule is noted here, and applies only to Yarona FM's outlets. To listen live visit www.yaronafm.co.bw

References

External links

Radio stations in Botswana
1999 establishments in Botswana